

Heardred (or Hardulfus) was a medieval Bishop of Dunwich.

Heardred was consecrated before 781 and died between 789 and 793.

References

External links
 

Bishops of Dunwich (ancient)